Sudborough is a village and civil parish in North Northamptonshire. At the time of the 2001 census, the parish's population was 189 people, increasing to 202 at the 2011 Census.

The village's name means 'Southern fortification'.

Sudborough is bypassed by the A6116 road and is in the boundaries of the ancient Rockingham Forest; its nearest town is Thrapston,  to its south-east.

The Church of England parish church is dedicated to All Saints.

References

External links 

Brief description

Villages in Northamptonshire
Civil parishes in Northamptonshire
North Northamptonshire